Pflach is a municipality in the district of Reutte in the Austrian state of Tyrol. It is 3 km north of the centre of Reutte town, and 2.5 km south of the German border.

References

Cities and towns in Reutte District